Mountain pigeons are four species of birds in the genus Gymnophaps in the pigeon family Columbidae. They are found on islands in eastern Indonesia and Melanesia, where they inhabit hill and montane forest. They mostly have dull grey, white, or chestnut-brown plumage, with bright red skin around the eyes being their most distinctive feature. Males and females mostly look alike, but the Papuan mountain pigeon shows slight sexual dimorphism. Mountain pigeons are very social and are usually seen in flocks of at least 10–40 birds, although some species can form flocks of more than 100 individuals. They are generally quiet and do not make many vocalisations. However, they make a distinctive whooshing noise while leaving their high-altitude roosts to feed in the morning.

The genus was originally described by the Italian zoologist Tommaso Salvadori in 1874 and currently contains four species. The species are allopatric (having geographically isolated populations) and form a single superspecies. Mountain pigeons are arboreal (tree-inhabiting) and feed on a wide variety of fruit like figs and drupes, mainly foraging for food in the canopy. Nests can be of two types: the first type is a shallow depression in the forest floor or short grass, while the second is a platform of sticks placed at a height of several metres in a tree. Clutches consist of a single white egg. All four species are listed as being of least concern on the IUCN Red List.

Taxonomy and systematics
The genus Gymnophaps was introduced by the Italian zoologist Tommaso Salvadori in 1874 for the Papuan mountain pigeon (Gymnophaps albertisii), which is the type species of the genus. The name Gymnophaps combines the Ancient Greek words γυμνος (gumnos), meaning bare, and φαψ (phaps), meaning pigeon. In 1900, after the 1899 description of the Buru mountain pigeon as a species of Columba, the German ornithologist Ernst Hartert stated that if Gymnophaps was to be maintained, it would have to include the Buru mountain pigeon as well, although he preferred keeping both the Papuan and Buru mountain pigeons in Columba. The Seram mountain pigeon, originally described as a separate species, was moved into Gymnophaps as a subspecies of the Buru mountain pigeon in 1927. The German-American ornithologist Ernst Mayr described the pale mountain pigeon in 1931. In 2007, the Buru and Seram mountain pigeons were again split as distinct species by Frank Rheindt and Robert Hutchinson on the basis of differences in appearance. All four species in the genus are allopatric (having geographically isolated populations) and can be considered to form a single superspecies.

Gymnophaps was initially thought to be most closely related to Columba, but the Australian ornithologist Tom Iredale suggested in 1956 that it was more closely related to the fruit dove genus Ptilinopus due to arboreal and frugivorous nature. In 1963, the British ornithologist Derek Goodwin also hypothesized that Gymnophaps was more closely related to Ptilinopus and the imperial pigeon genus Ducula than Columba due to similarities in their plumage. A 2007 mitochondrial and nuclear DNA study of 41 pigeon genera by Sergio Pereira and colleagues found that Gymnophaps was most closely related to the topknot pigeon, with this clade being sister (the closest relative of) to Hemiphaga. These three genera are further sister to another clade formed by Ptilinopus, the cloven-feathered dove, and Alectroenas, with Ducula being the most basal genus in the group. The following cladogram shows the relationships within this group based on the study:

List of species

Description 

All four species of mountain pigeon are medium-sized pigeons with long tails and wings. They have dull grey, white, or chestnut-brown plumage and extensive red orbital skin. In most species, both sexes look similar, but the Papuan mountain pigeon displays slight sexual dimorphism, with females have greyish breasts and grey edges to the throat feathers, compared to the males' whitish breasts and maroon throat feathers. Mountain pigeons can be distinguished from other pigeons by the red skin around the eyes, the bluish-grey , and the scaly patterning on the wings.

Vocalisations 
Mountain pigeons are generally silent, but have been recorded giving a deep woooooo m or woom, soft whistles, a wheezy vrrhu, and a quiet vruu.

Distribution and habitat 
Mountain pigeons are all found on islands in the Maluku Islands and Melanesia. The Papuan mountain pigeon is found on New Guinea, Yapen, the D'Entrecasteaux Islands, the Bismarck Archipelago, and Bacan. The Buru mountain pigeon is endemic to Buru and the Seram mountain pigeon is endemic to Seram. The pale mountain pigeon is endemic to the Solomon Islands archipelago, where it is found on Bougainville, Kolombangara, Vangunu, Guadalcanal and Malaita.

All four species in the genus inhabit hill and montane forests, but frequently visit lowlands to feed. Some species also show seasonal movements, with large flocks of the Papuan mountain pigeon in the Schrader Range descending to visit beech forests during the rainy season from October to March.

Behaviour and ecology 
All four species of mountain pigeons are highly gregarious, usually being found in flocks of 10–40 birds, with flocks of the Papuan mountain pigeon having as many as 80 birds. Flocks of the pale mountain pigeon near fruiting trees can also have more than 100 individuals. Less commonly, mountain pigeons can also be found singly or in pairs.

Mountains pigeons generally roost high in mountains and descend in flocks to feed in the mornings. While doing so, they can drop hundreds of metres in a single dive. making a loud whooshing noise that is distinctive of the genus. The birds fly low above trees while leaving the roost, but fly very high while crossing lowlands.

Feeding 
Mountain pigeons are arboreal (tree-inhabiting) frugivores, feeding on a variety of fruit such as figs and drupes. They mostly forage in the canopy, although they are also sometimes found in the midstorey or understorey. In the pale mountain pigeon, birds that are disturbed during foraging fly explosively out of the tree. Some species will fly long distances to visit specific species of fruiting plants, while others have been recorded feeding on trees near the coast. The Papuan mountain pigeon has been recorded drinking water from puddles on the roadside and eating soil.

Breeding 

A display flight has been observed during the breeding season in the Papuan and Seram mountain pigeons. The male then stalls at the top of this rise and plummets again before returning to his perch. This is repeated periodically, with both males taking turns to display to the female. Male Seram mountain pigeons perform a similar display, but fly lower, less steeply, and continue to fly forward after descending instead of returning to the perch immediately.

The Papuan mountain pigeon's breeding season lasts from October to March in the Schrader Range, but it may breed throughout the year in other parts of its range. The pale mountain pigeon has been observed breeding from July to September. The only known nest of the Seram mountain pigeon was seen in September. Nothing is known about the Buru mountain pigeon's breeding. 

Mountain pigeons nests can be of two types: the first type is a shallow depression in the forest floor or short grass, while the second is a platform of sticks placed at a height of several metres in a tree. The Papuan mountain pigeon is thought to nest in a partially colonial manner. The Papuan, pale, and Seram mountain pigeons all lay clutches of one white egg, while the Buru mountain pigeon's clutch size is not known.

Predators and parasites 
Mountain pigeons have been recorded being parasitised by the feather louse Columbicola galei. They may also be hunted by the pygmy eagle.

Status 
The International Union for Conservation of Nature lists all four species of mountain pigeons as being of least concern due to their stable populations and sufficiently large ranges. The Papuan mountain pigeon is common on New Guinea, but local populations can vary widely. It is generally uncommon on New Britain and New Ireland and is thought to also be uncommon on Bacan. The pale mountain pigeon is also moderately common throughout its range and is very common on Kolombangara, where it roosts in flocks of hundreds. The population of the Buru mountain pigeon was estimated at 43,000 in 1989 and is currently thought to be between 20,000 and 50,000. The Seram mountain pigeon's population has not been estimated, but it is reportedly commoner on Seram than the Buru mountain pigeon is on Buru.

Notes

References

 
Bird genera
Taxa named by Tommaso Salvadori
Taxonomy articles created by Polbot